The Lad is a 1935 British comedy film directed by Henry Edwards and starring Gordon Harker, Betty Stockfeld and Jane Carr. It was made at Twickenham Studios. The film is based on a novel by Edgar Wallace.

Plot
Bill Shane is The Lad, an opportunistic petty criminal mistaken for a private detective. When Shane arrives at a remote country estate, he's offered much money not to delve into the private affairs of the Fandon family. Shane is all for taking the money and duping the family, but on being reunited with ex-girlfriend Pauline, now the Fandon's maid, he decides to turn over a new leaf.

Cast
 Gordon Harker as Bill Shane aka The Lad  
 Betty Stockfeld as Lady Fandon  
 Jane Carr as Pauline Grant  
 Michael Shepley as Arthur Maddeley 
 Gerald Barry as Lord Fandon  
 Geraldine Fitzgerald as Joan Fandon  
 Sebastian Shaw as Jimmy 
 John Turnbull as Inspector Martin  
 Ralph Truman as O'Shea  
 David Hawthorne as Major Grannitt  
 Wilfrid Caithness as Tanner  
 Barbara Everest as Mrs. Lorraine

Critical reception
The Radio Times wrote, "Gordon Harker was such a favourite of crime writer Edgar Wallace that he frequently had material especially tailored for him. It's hardly surprising, therefore, that the actor is totally at home in this serviceable adaptation of one of Wallace's most popular thrillers...Director Henry Edwards wisely keeps the action brisk and on the light side, as the mystery is hardly baffling and the performances are painfully stiff."

References

Bibliography
Low, Rachael. Filmmaking in 1930s Britain. George Allen & Unwin, 1985.
Wood, Linda. British Films, 1927–1939. British Film Institute, 1986.

External links

1935 films
1930s crime comedy films
British crime comedy films
Films shot at Twickenham Film Studios
Films directed by Henry Edwards
British black-and-white films
1935 comedy films
1930s English-language films
1930s British films